David Diringer (16 June 1900 – 13 February 1975) was a British linguist, palaeographer and writer. He was the author of several well-known books about writing systems.

Biography 

Diringer was born to Jacob Munzer and Mirl Diringer on 16 June 1900, in Tlumacz – at that time considered part of Austria, later Poland, but now Tlumach, Ukraine. He stayed in Tlumacz through high school but moved to Italy to earn, in 1927, his Doctor of Literature degree from the University of Florence. This was followed, in 1929, by a diploma in ancient history. He was appointed a professor at Florence (1931-1933), his first academic interest being the culture of the Etruscans. He did excavations in Tuscany from 1930 to 1939.
 
As anti-Jewish policies were put in place in Italy, he moved to England in 1939. His two brothers who remained in Tlumacz were both lost in the holocaust. In England he was at first, as an Italian citizen, interned on the Isle of Man as an "enemy alien." But he was released in November 1940 and actually then worked for the British Foreign Office.

After the war, he lectured in Semitic epigraphy at Cambridge University, establishing the Alphabet Museum there. It was while at Cambridge that he published most of his works on writing and writing systems. Three years before his death, he moved the Alphabet Museum to Tel Aviv, where he had a second residence.

When his magnum opus, The Alphabet: A Key to the History of Mankind, was published in 1948, it was greeted with effusive praise. In reviewing the book, Thomas Sebeok enthused: "There are few comprehensive studies on this subject in the English language since Isaac Taylor's fundamental contribution in 1883. But this book does much more than merely fill a gap: it is bound to stand as the most authoritative treatment of the history of alphabetic writing for a long time to come. This is because the book is extraordinarily scholarly and exhaustive. It is, incidentally, also quite exciting to read." William F. Albright had this to say in his review: "This great work ... will certainly displace all other books in its field for some time to come, at least for librarians and general readers. It contains an extraordinary mass of material in over 600 compactly printed pages...."

Diringer died in Cambridge, England, an emeritus professor at Cambridge, on 13 February 1975 and was survived by his wife Elena (nee Cecchini), and daughter Kedma.

The following biography appears on the back dust-jacket flap of Writing (1962):

Bibliography 

 The Alphabet: A Key to the History of Mankind; 
 History of the Alphabet, 1977; 
 
 The Alphabet, 
 The Illuminated Book; 
Writing [Its Origins and Early History], 1962. New York: Praeger (Volume 25 in the series, Ancient Peoples and Places)
 The Story of the Aleph Beth, 1958
 The Hand-produced Book. New York: Philosophical Library, 1953.

References 

Linguists from the United Kingdom
English non-fiction writers
1900 births
1975 deaths
English male non-fiction writers
20th-century English historians
English palaeographers
Linguists of Hebrew
20th-century linguists
20th-century English male writers
People from Tlumach
British people of Polish-Jewish descent